Le inchieste del commissario Maigret (i.e. 'The inquiries of the superintendent Maigret') is an Italian television series based on the detective fiction of Georges Simenon about the French police  Jules Maigret,  portrayed by Gino Cervi, directed by Mario Landi, in sixteen episodes, produced by RAI.
Shot in black and white, the series was very successful: the last  season  (1972) was followed by eighteen and a half million viewers.

Episodes
(with dates of first broadcast on Rai Uno)

Series 1

 , Novel, (broadcast in three episodes, December 27, 1964, and 1–3 January 1965)    
 , Novel, (10, 15 and 17 January 1965) 
 , Novel, (10 January 1965)    
  (A Battle of Nerves), Novel (7, 12 and 14 February 1965)

Series 2

 , Novel (20–27 February 1965)    
 , Novel (le 6, 13, 20 et 27 March 1966)    
  Short story, (3 April 1966)  
  Short story, (7 April 1966)

Series 3

  (The Patience of Maigret), Novel (19–26 May and 2 June 1968)    
 , Short story, (7 July 1968)    
 , Short story, (9 July 1968)    
 ,  Novel, (14, 21 and 28 July 1968)    
  (Maigret on the Defensive), Novel (4, 11 and 18 August 1968)

Series 4

  (2–3 September 1972)    
  (9–10 September 1972)    
  (Maigret in Retirement), (16–17 September 1972)

Cast

Main and recurring
 Gino Cervi as Commissaire Maigret
 Andreina Pagnani as Mme Maigret
 Mario Maranzana as Inspecteur Lucas
 Manlio Busoni as Inspecteur Torrence
 Daniele Tedeschi as Inspecteur Janvier
 Gianni Musy as Inspecteur Lapointe
 Oreste Lionello as Dr. Moers
 Franco Volpi as Judge Coméliau
 Edoardo Toniolo as Police Director
 Rino Genovese as Bailiff Leopold

Guest cast
 Notable guest stars include

See also 
Maigret a Pigalle (1966)

External links
 

Italian crime television series
Detective television series
1964 Italian television series debuts
1972 Italian television series endings
Television shows based on Belgian novels
Television shows based on works by Georges Simenon
RAI original programming